Barn house, Barnhouse or Barn House may refer to:
 a converted barn, an old barn remodeled for another use.
 a historical house type of a combined house and barn called a byre-dwelling or housebarn
 Barnhouse Settlement, an archaeological site in Scotland
 Barn House, a historic district in Massachusetts, US
 Barnhouse, a surname; notable people with the name include:
 Charles Lloyd Barnhouse (1865–1929), American music publisher
Donald Barnhouse (1895–1960), American preacher and writer

See also 
 Barnhouse Effect